Sachalinobia is a genus of flower longhorns in the beetle family Cerambycidae. There are at least two described species in Sachalinobia.

Species
These two species belong to the genus  Sachalinobia:
 Sachalinobia koltzei (Heyden, 1887) c g
 Sachalinobia rugipennis (Newman, 1844) i c g b
Data sources: i = ITIS, c = Catalogue of Life, g = GBIF, b = Bugguide.net

References

Further reading

External links

 
 

Lepturinae